The Film School of the Aristotle University of Thessaloniki (AUTH) is a higher educational film school in Greece. It offers a five years 1st and 2nd circle program leading to an Integrated Master degree in Film.

Schools directions

There are 8 areas in Film where students can specialize:

1. Screenwriting

2. Directing

3. Film Production

4. Cinematography

5. Editing

6. Sound

7. Art Direction

8. Film History and Theory

Schools MA Programs
The Film Department has two Master programs.

1. Creative Writing and Screenwriting (Since 2018, co-organized with University of Western Macedonia).

2. Film and Television Studies (Since 2019).

History
The Film department was founded by the 3255/2004 ΦΕΚ 138/Α/22.7.2004 law of the Greek State  and began its operation during the academic year 2004–2005. It is one of the four departments of the Aristotle University of Thessaloniki Faculty of Fine Arts 
(with the three others being School of Drama, School of Music Studies and School of Visual and Applied Arts).

Honorary doctorates  

Michael Cacoyannis (2005)

Pantelis Voulgaris (2012)

Costa-Gavras (2013)

See also 
 List of universities in Greece
 European Higher Education Area
 List of film schools

External links 
Film Schools website

References

Film schools in Greece

2004 establishments in Greece